Proletarul ('Proletarian') was a socialist newspaper published from Botoșani, Kingdom of Romania. The newspaper began publishing on 1 March (O.S.) (13 March (N.S.)), 1892. It was the organ of the Workers Club of Botoșani. It was managed by an editorial committee. Amongst the contributors to Proletarul were Dr. Panait Zosin and Henric Sanielevici. It was published twice monthly, the typography was done as Goldșleger & Comp.

References

Newspapers established in 1892
Defunct newspapers published in Romania
Romanian-language newspapers
Socialist newspapers
Publications with year of disestablishment missing
Biweekly newspapers